The 2022 Montevideo Open was a professional women's tennis tournament played on outdoor red clay courts at the Carrasco Lawn Tennis Club in Montevideo, Uruguay. It was the second edition of the tournament and part of the 2022 WTA 125 tournaments. It took place at the Carrasco Lawn Tennis Club in Montevideo, Uruguay between November 22 and 27, 2022.

Singles entrants

Seeds

 Rankings are as of November 14, 2022.

Other entrants
The following players received wildcards into the singles main draw:
  Martina Capurro Taborda
  Guillermina Grant
  Julia Riera
  Solana Sierra

The following players received entry from the qualifying draw:
  Emiliana Arango
  Tímea Babos
  Eva Vedder
  You Xiaodi

The following player received entry into the main draw as a lucky loser:
  Yvonne Cavallé Reimers

Withdrawals
Before the tournament
  Julia Grabher → replaced by  Diana Shnaider
  Maja Chwalińska → replaced by  Kateryna Baindl
  Danka Kovinić → replaced by  Rosa Vicens Mas
  Elizabeth Mandlik → replaced by  Irina Bara
  Chloé Paquet → replaced by  Hailey Baptiste
  Nuria Párrizas Díaz → replaced by  María Carlé
  Panna Udvardy → replaced by  Yvonne Cavallé Reimers

Doubles entrants

Seeds 

 1 Rankings as of 14 November 2022.

Other entrants 
The following pair received a wildcard into the doubles main draw:
  Guillermina Grant /  Noelia Zeballos

Champions

Singles

  Diana Shnaider def.  Léolia Jeanjean, 6–4, 6–4

Doubles

  Ingrid Gamarra Martins /  Luisa Stefani def.  Quinn Gleason /  Elixane Lechemia 7–5, 6–7(6–8), [10–6]

External links
 Official website

References

2022 WTA 125 tournaments
November 2022 sports events in Uruguay